The 1906 United Kingdom general election in Ireland was held in January 1906. Ninety-nine of the seats were in single-member districts using the first-past-the-post electoral system, and the constituencies of Cork City and Dublin University were two-member districts using block voting.

In the election as a whole, the Liberal Party won a clear majority in the election across the United Kingdom and Henry Campbell-Bannerman was appointed as Prime Minister. This was the first time since the split in the Liberal Party in 1886 that they governed without the support of the Irish Parliamentary Party.

Results

See also
 History of Ireland (1801–1923)

References

1906
Ireland
1906 elections in Ireland